Research suggests that men and women differ in their psychological responses to infertility. Samaira Malik, from the Institute of Work, Health, and Organizations at the University of Nottingham, UK, said, “men are in fact equally affected by the unfulfilled desire for a child but are less open about their feelings.” 

Men undergo various battles when facing personal infertility. These battles include anxiety concerning potency, masculinity, and sexual adequacy. Dr. Rheta Keylor of the Massachusetts Institute for Psychoanalysis stated that, male infertility is an "assault on a man's sense of self revives feelings of competition, castration, and experiences of developmental trauma.”  Studies concerning such effects on infertile males are few in number and have come to the forefront in the past decade starting in 2001. In the Psychoanalytic Electronic Publishing archives of the seven primary psychoanalytic journals from 1927 to 2000, not a single article on male infertility appears. Paradoxically, the male partner is either the sole cause or a contributing cause of infertility in 49% of couples. Throughout history men have recognized the desire for paternity and the possibility for male infertility; however, women are typically the subject of fertility studies.

Effects of infertility on potency

Feelings of stress, depression, guilt, or anxiety in infertile men can cause psychogenic impotence, which heightens the feelings of inadequacy that already accompany infertility. The psychological stress of infertility has been shown to affect sperm parameters in significant and demonstrable ways that may further contribute to difficulties with erectile potency; emotional reactions to the infertility may alter or even undermine a previous consolidation of a sense of self as sexually adequate. Infertility weighs on many males' minds; this creates mental instability, which often results in impotence. Psychological causes of impotency may include:

Clinical depression
Medications
Fatigue
Stress
Relationship issues
social interaction

All of the listed issues above can arise as a result of psychological effects of infertility in men.

Effects of infertility on masculinity

The diagnosis of infertility causes many males to question their masculinity. Male factor infertility is frequently associated with high levels of social stigma; for example, in a study exploring the views of fertile individuals towards infertile men and women, Miall (1994) found that male infertility was frequently seen as arising from sexual dysfunction and was thus associated with higher levels of stigma than female infertility. Many people assume that infertile men cannot perform sexually. This stigma adds to the heightened insecurities in infertile men. Laura A. Peronace, from the School of Psychology at Cardiff University, said,  “Male factor infertility is proposed to have such a social stigma that it produces stress, and a culture of secrecy and protectiveness to the extent that women sometimes even take the blame for the couple's childlessness.”  However, infertile men are likely to be depressive and anxious, and have lower masculinity scores and self-esteem. Often, males do not show emotional stress in attempts to be the emotional stability within the relationship. Men cannot suppress such feelings for long periods of time without repercussions.

Effects of infertility on sexual adequacy

Feelings about fertility and sexual adequacy are interconnected for many men, especially through male factor infertility. Couples with long term infertility, who have faced much treatment failure, report higher levels of depression, low satisfaction with their sex lives, and low levels of well being.”  The stigma of male factor infertility described earlier has huge effects on the man. The problems infertile men have with sexual inadequacy stem from social ridicule and resulting low self-esteem. It is estimated that 40% of infertile individuals experience significant emotional distress with possible long-term implications. M.J. Muller, from the University of Mainz, Germany, said, “Sexual dissatisfaction of infertile men could also be related to a withdrawal from sexual activities and hence to even lower chances of conception.”  Infertility can plague an individual all of their life. Subjects are infertile if they have unprotected sex for 12 months resulting in no pregnancy. This means that the diagnosed infertility may be temporary and/or reversible.

Psychological treatment

The most prevalent psychological treatment is counseling and marriage therapy. A lot of men believe that there are numerous disincentives to psychological treatment despite its potential benefits, especially for those forms of infertility most linked to psychological and behavioral factors. Men are much less likely to seek out psychological help than women. Men who acknowledge infertility, articulate the sources of their anxiety, express their loss of confidence in sexual adequacy, deal openly with their wives' disappointment and anger, and consciously redefine their male and marital roles show improved sperm counts and may even be more successful at impregnating their wives. There is an important role of psychoanalytic treatment when dealing with male infertility.

Citations

References

Male infertility
Psychological effects
Sexology